The Copa Dominicana de Fútbol is the top tournament association football in the Dominican Republic. Created in 2015, it is open to all clubs and is affiliated with the Dominican Football Federation.

Teams

Liga Dominicana de Fútbol

Semi-pro

Group Phase

Metropolitan Zone

Group A

Group B

Group C

North Zone

Group D

Group E

Group F

Second round

Metropolitan Zone

North Zone

Finals

Quarter finals
Date: November 19 & 20  
Universidad O&M FC 2(4) vs 2(3)Club Atlético Pantoja
Bauger FC 0 vs 4Atlético San Cristóbal
Cibao Atletico 4 vs 2 Club 6 de Febrero
Cibao FC 2 vs 1 Don Bosco FC

Semifinals 
Date: November 24 & 26
Universidad O&M FC 1 vs 2 Atlético San Cristóbal
Universidad O&M FC 4(5) vs 1 (3)Atlético San Cristóbal
Cibao Atletico 1 vs 4 Cibao FC
Cibao Atletico 0(1) vs 3(7)Cibao FC

Final 
Date: December 4
Universidad O&M FC 0 vs 2 Cibao FC

References 

Football in the Dominican Republic